The Arctic ground squirrel (Urocitellus parryii) (Inuktitut: ᓯᒃᓯᒃ, siksik) is a species of ground squirrel native to the Arctic and Subarctic of North America and Asia. People in Alaska, particularly around the Aleutians, refer to them as "parka" squirrels, most likely because their pelt is good for the ruff on parkas and for clothing.

Taxonomy
Subspecies listed alphabetically.
U. p. ablusus Osgood, 1903
U. p. kennicottii Ross, 1861 – Barrow ground squirrel (northern Alaska, northern Yukon, and northern Northwest Territories)
U. p. kodiacensis Ross, 1861
U. p. leucostictus Brandt, 1844
U. p. lyratus Hall and Gilmore, 1932
U. p. nebulicola Osgood, 1903
U. p. osgoodi Merriam, 1900
U. p. parryii Richardson, 1825
U. p. plesius Osgood, 1900
U. p. stejnegeri J. A. Allen, 1903

Description
The Arctic ground squirrel has a beige and tan coat with a white-spotted back. This squirrel has a short face, small ears, a dark tail and white markings around its eyes. Arctic ground squirrels undergo a coat change from summer to winter. Summer coats include red/yellow colorations along the cheeks and sides of the animal. In fall, these red patches are replaced with silvery fur.

Distribution and habitat
The Arctic ground squirrel can be found in regions of Northern Canada ranging from the Arctic Circle to northern British Columbia, and down to the southern border of the Northwest Territories, as well as Alaska and Siberia.

The Arctic ground squirrel is native to the North American Arctic tundra, where its main habitats are on mountain slopes, river flats, banks, lakeshores and tundra ridges of the arctic tundra. Ground squirrels live in sandy soil due to easy digging and good drainage. Arctic ground squirrels make shallow burrows in areas where the permafrost does not prevent them from digging.
The Arctic ground squirrel inhabits dry Arctic tundra and open meadows in the most southern habitats of this species.

Behaviour

The diurnal Arctic ground squirrel lives on the tundra and is prey to the Arctic fox, the red fox, the wolverine, Canada lynx, Eurasian lynx, the brown bear, and eagles. It is one of the few Arctic animals, along with their close relatives the marmots and the un-related little brown bat, that hibernate. In the summer it forages for tundra plants, seeds, and fruit to increase body fat for its winter hibernation. By late summer the male Arctic ground squirrel begins to store food in its burrow so that in the spring it will have edible food until the new vegetation has grown. The burrows are lined with lichens, leaves, and muskox hair.

Communication between squirrels is done through both vocal and physical means. When they meet, nose to nose contact is made or other body parts are pressed together. The "tsik-tsik" calls are made in response to threats and vary as between different predators. Deep guttural sounds are used to indicate land-based predators while short "band whistle" chatter indicates danger from the air.

Hibernation 
Peripheral, colonic, and blood temperatures become subzero. The best theory as to why the squirrel's blood doesn't freeze is that the animal is able to cleanse their bodies of ice nucleators which are necessary for the development of ice crystals. In the absence of ice nucleators, body fluids can remain liquid while in supercooled state. This process is being studied with the hope that mechanism present in arctic ground squirrels may provide a path for better preservation of human organs for transplant. The connections between brain cells also wither away in this state. The damage should have resulted in death, but research on related species show that these connections regrow after waking up. In the warmer months, the squirrel is active during the day.

Diet
This squirrel feeds on grasses, sedges, mushrooms, bog rushes, bilberries, willows, roots, stalks, leaves, leaf buds, flowers, catkins, and seeds. They will also eat insects, and occasionally they will even feed on carrion (such as mice, snowshoe hares and caribou) as well as juvenile Arctic ground squirrels. Sometimes these squirrels carry food back to their den in their cheeks.

Reproduction
During the mating season, males engage in male-male aggressive encounters for mating rights.

Arctic ground squirrels live individually in burrow systems. Mating occurs between mid-April and mid-May (depending on latitude) after winter hibernation. Mating includes male-male competition for access to females, and litters are typically sired by multiple males. Gestation is approximately 25 days, and results in a litter of 5 to 10,  hairless pups. After 6 weeks the pups are weaned and this is followed by rapid growth to prepare for the upcoming winter.

Conservation

Although Environment Yukon has not estimated their population size, their conservation status is currently said to be "secure" (Environment Yukon 2013).
The Arctic ground squirrel is classified as least concern (LC) on the IUCN Red List (Arkive 2013).

References

Further reading
 Hall, E. Raymond (1981). The Mammals of North America. 2 volumes. Ronald Press.
 
 Thorington, R. W. Jr. and R. S. Hoffman (2005). Family Sciuridae. pp. 754–818 in Mammal Species of the World a Taxonomic and Geographic Reference. D.E. Wilson and D.M. Reeder eds. Johns Hopkins University Press, Baltimore.

External links

Urocitellus
Mammals of the Arctic
Arctic land animals
Mammals described in 1825
Mammals of Russia
Mammals of Siberia
Mammals of the United States
Mammals of Canada
Holarctic fauna